Stirling is a usually masculine given name which may refer to:

Stirling Colgate (1925–2013), American physicist at Los Alamos National Laboratory
Stirling Fessenden (1875–1944), Chairman of the Shanghai Municipal Council
Stirling Gallacher (born 1970), English actress
Stirling Hinchliffe (born 1970), Australian politician
Stirling Mortlock (born 1977), Australian former professional rugby player
Stirling Moss (1929–2020), English race car driver
Stirling Silliphant (1918–1996), American screenwriter and producer

See also
 Sterling (given name)

Masculine given names